Selection was the process of designating inmates for either execution or forced labor at a Nazi concentration camp. 

The arrival selection was first a separation by gender, and then a separation into either fit or unfit for work, as determined by a soldier or bureaucrat or doctor after a visual inspection or perhaps a question or two. Children under 16 and later 14, the elderly, women visibly pregnant, mothers who would not leave their children, the disabled, or anyone visibly weak or ill, were ineligible for "selection" and were simply sent to their deaths. The selection officers were nominally looking for healthier, stronger laborers, but according to historian Jan Erik Schulte, camp guards and administrators were given maximum discretion in selections, which resulted in "ultimately only a superficially utilitarian-motivated selection process." 

The selection process was heavily dependent on the labor-force needs of the camp at that time. Approximately 1 in 5 of all transported prisoners survived selection and were thus enslaved. Selection was specific to the camps, such as Auschwitz or Majdanek, that served some kind of industrial function for the regime. As one article put it, "Like Auschwitz-Birkenau, Majdanek was the rare concentration camp that was also a death camp. Forced labor from the camp was to man the shops and factories of an SS empire that would be centered in Lublin. This empire never materialized as SS chief Heinrich Himmler had fantasized, but some of its building blocks, including Majdanek, were put in place. The Germans established an elaborate hierarchy of power and order in the camp, which relied on violence from the camp commander down to the barracks elders for its functioning." The  extermination camps, such as Belzec, Chełmno, Sobibor and Treblinka, had essentially no selection, only death by gas. 

Dr. Mengele used selection to find twins for his experiments at Auschwitz, as recalled by Eva Mozes Kor.

References 

Holocaust terminology